Disney Star Chinese Channel is a Taiwanese general entertainment television channel operated by The Walt Disney Company (Taiwan) Ltd. Its programming features drama, variety, lifestyle, and talk shows in Mandarin. Launched on 21 October 1991 at 16:30 Hong Kong Time by its predecessor Star TV, the channel originally targeted audiences in Greater China broadcasting in both Mandarin and Cantonese, before it reduced broadcasting area to just Taiwan and began broadcasting only in Mandarin on 30 March 1996.

History 
One of the first five original channels of Star TV, Star Chinese Channel was launched on 21 October 1991 at 16:30 Hong Kong Time as STAR TV Chinese Channel, the channel originally targeted audiences in Greater China broadcasting in both Mandarin and Cantonese. Star Chinese Channel was launched as 24-hour all full Mandarin Chinese variety entertainment channel that showcased full Chinese language content provided by TVB and ATV in Hong Kong broadcasts from Mainland China; also showed television series from other Greater China countries including China, Hong Kong, Macau, Taiwan and Singapore. It is also the first commercial broadcasting-owned channel to broadcast in Taiwan. It was a free-to-air channel, but at some point, Star TV encrypted the channel. The channel was previously broadcast across Greater China, but on 30 March 1996 at 19:00 Hong Kong Time, Star TV split STAR TV Chinese Channel by certain areas and reduced its broadcasting area to just Taiwan (Viewers in Greater China apart from Taiwan were offered Phoenix Chinese Channel instead).

At one point, the channel's officially launched new located, new transmitter, new headquarters, new studios, new network, new provider, new content, new media city, new broadcast drive, new transmission, new power, new station, new operation, new corporate and new head office from British Hong Kong to Taipei.

Shiau Hong-chi says that the original business for Star TV was to broadcast popular American shows to Taiwanese audience with as less effort as possible. Shiau then argues that however the plan was unsuccessful and Star TV had to invest on localized branches such as Chinese Channel and Channel V Taiwan and make local shows.

Feeds

Taiwan
 Star Chinese Channel (衛視中文台)
 Star Entertainment Channel (星衛娛樂台): An alternative channel available on CHT MOD and certain cable TV providers in Taiwan.

References

External links 
  (Taiwan)

Television stations in Taiwan
Television channels and stations established in 1991
1991 establishments in Taiwan
Fox Networks Group
Disney television networks